Paraleuctra is a genus of rolled-winged stoneflies in the family Leuctridae. There are more than 20 described species in Paraleuctra.

Species
These 26 species belong to the genus Paraleuctra:

 Paraleuctra alta Baumann & Stark, 2009
 Paraleuctra ambulans Shimizu, 2000
 Paraleuctra angulata Shimizu, 2000
 Paraleuctra baei Murányi & Hwang, 2017
 Paraleuctra cercia (Okamoto, 1922)
 Paraleuctra cervicornis Du & Qian, 2012
 Paraleuctra concava Shimizu, 2000
 Paraleuctra divisa (Hitchcock, 1958)
 Paraleuctra ezoensis Shimizu, 2000
 Paraleuctra forcipata (Frison, 1937)
 Paraleuctra hokurikuensis Shimizu, 2000
 Paraleuctra jewetti Nebeker & Gaufin, 1966
 Paraleuctra malaisei Zwick, 2010
 Paraleuctra occidentalis (Banks, 1907)
 Paraleuctra okamotoa (Claassen, 1936)
 Paraleuctra orientalis (Chu, 1928)
 Paraleuctra paramalaisei Murányi & Hwang, 2017
 Paraleuctra projecta (Frison, 1942)
 Paraleuctra qilianshana Li & Yang, 2013
 Paraleuctra sara (Claassen, 1937) (Appalachian needlefly)
 Paraleuctra similis Shimizu, 2000
 Paraleuctra sinica Yang & Yang, 1995
 Paraleuctra tetraedra Harper, 1977
 Paraleuctra tianmushana Li & Yang, 2010
 Paraleuctra vershina Gaufin & Ricker, 1974 (summit needlefly)
 Paraleuctra zapekinae Zhiltzova, 1974

References

Further reading

 
 

Plecoptera
Articles created by Qbugbot